Giuseppe Donati (2 December 1836 – 14 February 1925) was the inventor of the classical ocarina, a ceramic wind instrument based on the principle of a Helmholtz resonator.

Donati was born in Budrio.  Legend has it that he created his first "little goose" ("ocarina" in Italian dialect) in 1853, aged 17, whilst still working as a brickmaker. His first ocarina-making workshop was in his hometown of Budrio. When he moved to larger premises in Bologna in 1878, a fellow musician of the Gruppo Ocarinistico, Cesare Vicinelli, continued the Budrio workshop.   Donati died, aged 88, in Milan.

External links
Budrio Ocarina Museum 

1836 births
1925 deaths
Italian musical instrument makers
19th-century Italian inventors
19th-century Italian musicians
Ocarina makers
Brickmakers